Neon Swing X-perience (NSX) was founded in 1998 by Mike Urick (trumpet/vocalist) near Jeannette, Pennsylvania.  Since then, the band has been dedicated to preserving varied forms of "Americana" music - particularly those types inspired or rooted in the big bands of the 1930s and 1940s.

The band has independently released seven CD's and is recording an eighth to be released for its twenty-year anniversary.

Since beginning, the band has played hundreds of shows and have toured 12 states throughout the US - including playing the legendary Derby in Hollywood, CA and the Viva Las Vegas Rockabilly Festival in Vegas.  NSX has appeared live twice on WDVE (102.5 FM Pittsburgh) and has been labeled as "swing with sting" for breathing new energy into the classic swing style.  The band was named one of Pittsburgh's top jazz performers in City Paper's "Best of Pittsburgh" 2017 poll.  In its 20-year history, the band has also opened for or performed the same event as Glenn Miller Orchestra, Big Bad Voodoo Daddy, Preservation Hall Jazz Band, Hot Club of Cowtown, Reverend Horton Heat, Max Weinberg Big Band, Jive Aces, and Jerry Lee Lewis among others.

Band members have changed significantly since 1998, but the current line-up includes: Urick, Wally  Hunter (various saxes, trumpet, clarinet), Joe Palacki (drums), Steve Tomkowitz (sax), Dave Frye (guitar), Carmen Marotta (keys), Chris Dufalla (trombone), and Randy Miller and Ken Reeser (splitting bass duties).

References

External links
 official site
 myspace page

American swing musical groups
Musical groups from Pittsburgh